Sabiha Nahar Begum (born 15 January 1950) is Bangladesh Awami League politician and Member of the Parliament. She was elected from reserved seats for women during 10th Jatiya Sangsad election in 2014.

Background
Begum was born on 15 January 1950. She nominated to the Parliament of Bangladesh as part of the 50 reserved seats for women, as a candidate from Bangladesh Awami League.

References

Living people
1950 births
Women members of the Jatiya Sangsad
10th Jatiya Sangsad members
21st-century Bangladeshi women politicians
Awami League politicians